Act Like You Know is a 1991 album by MC Lyte.

Act Like You Know may also refer to:

Albums
 Act Like You Know, a 2007 album by Gal Level

Songs
 "Act Like You Know", a song by MC Lyte from the album Act Like You Know, 1991
 "Act Like You Know", a song by Pete Rock & CL Smooth from the album Mecca and the Soul Brother, 1992
 "Act Like You Know", a song by Dizzee Rascal from the album E3 AF, 2020
 "Act Like You Know", a 1982 song by Fat Larry's Band
 "Act Like You Know", a 2005 song by Nero